German submarine U-128 was a Type IXC U-boat of Nazi Germany's Kriegsmarine during World War II. She was sunk 17 May 1943, by American action.

Design
German Type IXC submarines were slightly larger than the original Type IXBs. U-128 had a displacement of  when at the surface and  while submerged. She had two shafts and two  propellers.

U-128 was fitted with six  torpedo tubes (four fitted at the bow and two at the stern), 22 torpedoes, one  SK C/32 naval gun, 180 rounds, and a  SK C/30 as well as a  C/30 anti-aircraft gun. The boat had a complement of forty-eight.

Service history
Ordered on 7 August 1939 from DeSchiMAG AG Weser in Bremen, U-128 was laid down on 10 July 1940, launched on 20 February 1941 and commissioned by Kapitänleutnant Ulrich Heyse on 12 May 1941.

The boat was a training vessel in the second flotilla until 30 November 1941 based in Wilhelmshaven. She was then based in Lorient.

During her six completed war patrols, U-128 sank 12 ships, for a total of 83,639 tons. On 1 March 1943 command was transferred to Kptlt. Hermann Steinert, who commanded her until her loss a few months later.

Fate
On 17 May 1943, while operating in the South Atlantic near Pernambuco, two Mariner flying boats, PBM 74-P5 and PBM-74-P6 of the US Navy Patrol Squadron VP-74, made U-128 surface with depth charges. Two US Navy destroyers ( and ) also hit her with 5-inch gunfire. The crew opened the submarine's seacocks as they abandoned ship, scuttling the submarine. The final toll was seven dead but there were 47 survivors.

Summary of raiding history

References

Bibliography

External links

World War II submarines of Germany
World War II shipwrecks in the Atlantic Ocean
1941 ships
Ships built in Bremen (state)
German Type IX submarines
U-boats commissioned in 1941
U-boats scuttled in 1943
Maritime incidents in May 1943